Harry Broadbent may refer to:
 Harry Frank Broadbent (1910–1958), British pilot
 Punch Broadbent (1892–1971), Canadian ice hockey player
 Harry Broadbent (born 1975), British keyboardist, member of Kula Shaker